Zinc finger protein 350 is a protein that in humans is encoded by the ZNF350 gene.

Interactions 

ZNF350 has been shown to interact with BRCA1.

See also 
 Zinc finger

References

Further reading

External links 
 

Transcription factors